Bright Turkey Party (ATP) was a right-wing party founded on 27 November 1998 by Oktay Öztürk. The party did not take part in the general elections of 1999. The party polled 0.29% of the vote in the 2007 Turkish general elections. The party dissolved on 11 April 2010.

External links
 

1998 establishments in Turkey
2010 disestablishments in Turkey
Defunct conservative parties in Turkey
Defunct nationalist parties in Turkey
Political parties established in 1998
Political parties disestablished in 2010
Turkish nationalist organizations